Incomplete is the first compilation album by Japanese visual kei band Diaura, released on 15 December, 2015, by Ains. It debuted on Oricon's weekly chart at the 38th place, and 2nd on the Indies chart. The album includes 27 tracks on two CDS, with one new track, titled "Black Sheep under the Shallow Sleep". The DVD extra contains footage of the band's Shibuya concert in June 2015.

Track listing

References

2015 compilation albums
Diaura albums